The 40th Heli Squadron is a helicopter squadron of the Air Component based at Koksijde Air Base. It is dedicated to search and rescue, anti-submarine warfare and troop transportation operations. It operates four NH90 NFH helicopters. Before the arrival of the NH90 NFH the squadron operated Westland Sea King and Alouette III helicopters on behalf of the Maritime Component, the Squadron embarks a helicopter on F930 Leopold I and F931 Louise-Marie -  frigates when sailing on deployment and has also have had helicopter embarked on Dutch frigates as well

Organisation

40th Helicopter Squadron consists of
HQ staff and Support  Flight
Helicopter Flight
Maintenance Flight

References

Heli Squadron, 40